Harold Foss "Hal" Foster (born August 13, 1955) is an American art critic and historian. He was educated at Princeton University, Columbia University, and the City University of New York. He taught at Cornell University from 1991 to 1997 and has been on the faculty at Princeton since 1997. In 1998 he received a Guggenheim Fellowship.

Foster's criticism focuses on the role of the avant-garde within postmodernism. In 1983, he edited The Anti-Aesthetic: Essays on Postmodern Culture, a seminal text in postmodernism. In Recodings (1985), he promoted a vision of postmodernism that simultaneously engaged its avant-garde history and commented on contemporary society. In The Return of the Real (1996), he proposed a model of historical recurrence of the avant-garde in which each cycle would improve upon the inevitable failures of previous cycles. He views his roles as critic and historian of art as complementary rather than mutually opposed.

Early life and education
Foster was born Aug. 13, 1955, in Seattle, Washington. His father was a partner in the law firm of Foster, Pepper & Shefelman. He attended Lakeside School in Seattle, where Microsoft founder Bill Gates was a classmate.

He graduated with an A.B. in English from Princeton University in 1977 after completing a 106-page long senior thesis titled "Ted Hughes and Geoffrey Hill: Two Poets in a Tradition." He received a Master of Arts in English from Columbia University in 1979. He received his Ph.D. in art history from the City University of New York in 1990, writing his dissertation on Surrealism under Rosalind Krauss.

Career
After graduating from Princeton, Foster moved to New York City, where he worked for Artforum from 1977 to 1981. He was then an editor at Art in America until 1987, when he became Director of Critical and Curatorial Studies at the Whitney Museum.

In 1982, a friend from Lakeside School founded Bay Press to publish The Mink's Cry, a children's book written by Foster. In the following year Bay Press published The Anti-Aesthetic: Essays on Postmodern Culture, a collection of essays on postmodernism edited by Foster that became a seminal text of postmodernism. In 1985, Bay Press published Recodings, Foster's first collection of essays. The Anti-Aesthetic and Recordings were, respectively, Bay Press's best and second best selling titles. Foster founded Zone in 1985 and was its editor until 1992.

In 1991, Foster left the Whitney to join the faculty of Cornell University's Department of the History of Art. That same year, Foster became an editor of the journal October; he was still on the board as of 2011. In 1997 he joined the faculty of his undergraduate alma mater, Princeton University, in the Department of Art and Archaeology. In 2000 he became the Townsend Martin Professor of Art and Archaeology at Princeton. He chaired the Department of Art and Archaeology from 2005 to 2009. In September 2011 he was appointed to the search committee to find a new dean for Princeton's School of Architecture. He is a faculty fellow of Wilson College.

Foster received a Guggenheim Fellowship in 1998. In 2010 he was elected a fellow of the American Academy of Arts and Sciences and awarded the Clark Prize for Excellence in Arts Writing by the Clark Art Institute. Spring 2011 he won a Berlin Prize fellowship of the American Academy in Berlin. In 2013–14 he was appointed practitioner in residence at Camberwell College of Arts in London.

Criticism
In his introduction to The Anti-Aesthetic (1983), Foster described a distinction between complicity with and resistance to capitalism within postmodernism. The book included contributions by Jean Baudrillard, Douglas Crimp, Kenneth Frampton, Jürgen Habermas, Fredric Jameson, Rosalind Krauss, Craig Owens, Edward Saïd, and Gregory Ulmer.

In Recodings 1985, Foster focused on the role of the avant-garde within postmodernism. He advocated a postmodernism that engages in both a continuation of its historical roots in the avant-garde and contemporary social and political critique, in opposition to what he saw as a "pluralistic" impulse to abandon the avant-garde in favor of more aesthetically traditional and commercially viable modes. He promoted artists he saw as exemplifying this vision, among them Dara Birnbaum, Jenny Holzer, Barbara Kruger, Louise Lawler, Sherrie Levine, Allan McCollum, Martha Rosler, and Krzysztof Wodiczko. Foster favored expansion of the scope of postmodernist art from galleries and museums to a broader class of public locations and from painting and sculpture to other media. He saw postmodernism's acknowledgment of differences in viewers' backgrounds and lack of deference to expertise as important contributions to the avant-garde.

By the mid-1990s, Foster had come to believe that the dialectic within the avant-garde between historical engagement and contemporary critique had broken down. In his view, the latter came to be preferred over the former as interest was elevated over quality. In The Return of the Real (1996), taking as his model Karl Marx's reaction against G. W. F. Hegel, he sought to rebut Peter Bürger's assertion – which he made in Theory of the Avant-Garde (1974) – that the neo-avant-garde largely represented a repetition of the projects and achievements of the historical avant-garde, and therefore it was a failure. Foster's model was based on a notion of "deferred action" inspired by the work of Sigmund Freud. He conceded the failure of the initial avant-garde wave (which included such figures as Marcel Duchamp) but argued that future waves could redeem earlier ones by incorporating through historical reference those aspects that had not been comprehended the first time around. Gordon Hughes compares this theory with Jean-François Lyotard's.

Foster has been critical of the field of visual culture, accusing it of "looseness". In a 1999 article in Social Text, Crimp rebutted Foster, criticizing his notion of the avant-garde and his treatment in The Return of the Real of sexual identity in Andy Warhol's work. Furthermore, this criticality spreads to both the practice and the field of design in his book Design and Crime (2002).

Foster views his roles as art critic and art historian as complementary rather than mutually opposed, in accordance with his adherence to postmodernism. In an interview published in the Journal of Visual Culture, he said, "I've never seen critical work in opposition to historical work: like many others I try to hold the two in tandem, in tension. History without critique is inert; criticism without history is aimless".

Bibliography

Books

 Recodings: Art, Spectacle, Cultural Politics, 1985. Bay Press.

 Compulsive Beauty, 1995. MIT Press.
 The Return of the Real: The Avant-Garde at the End of the Century, 1996. MIT Press.
 Design and Crime (And Other Diatribes), 2002. 2nd. ed, 2011. Verso Books.
 Art Since 1900: Modernism, Anti-Modernism, Postmodernism, 2005. With Rosalind Krauss, Yve-Alain Bois, and Benjamin Buchloh. Thames & Hudson.
 Pop (Themes & Movements), 2006. With Mark Francis. Phaidon Press.
 Prosthetic Gods, 2006. MIT Press.
 The Art-Architecture Complex, 2011. Verso Books.
 The First Pop Age: Painting and Subjectivity in the Art of Hamilton, Lichtenstein, Warhol, Richter, and Ruscha, 2011. Princeton University Press.
 Bad New Days: Art, Criticism, Emergency, 2015. Verso Books.
 What Comes after Farce? Art and Criticism at a Time of Debacle, 2020. Verso Books.
 Brutal Aesthetics, 2020. Princeton University Press.

Reprints

Book reviews

References

External links
 Princeton Faculty: Hal Foster
 The MIT Press: Hal Foster

American art critics
American art historians
Postmodern writers
Living people
Princeton University faculty
Cornell University faculty
Columbia Graduate School of Arts and Sciences alumni
Graduate Center, CUNY alumni
Writers from Seattle
1955 births
Lakeside School alumni
Historians from Washington (state)